Mike Capps may refer to:

 Michael Capps (politician), American politician
 Mike Capps (executive), former president of Epic Games
 Mike Capps (sportscaster), minor league baseball radio broadcaster and former news anchor and reporter